Man Gone Down (2006) is the debut novel of U.S. author Michael Thomas. It won the 2009 International Dublin Literary Award, with Thomas receiving a prize of €100,000 (£85,000, US$140,000). Man Gone Down is also recommended by The New York Times.

Plot introduction
The novel is about an African-American man estranged from his white wife and their children, and who must come up with a sum of money within four days to have them returned. The plot focuses on an attempt to achieve the American Dream. Thomas describes Man Gone Down as having a "gallows humour".

References

2006 American novels
African-American novels
Novels set in Boston
Novels set in New York City
2006 debut novels